Oksana Romanenkova, née Hutornaja, (born 1 November 1970 in Tallinn) is an Estonian figure skating coach and former competitor. She is a five-time Estonian national champion in ladies' singles. She gave birth to her son, Viktor Romanenkov, on 29 September 1993 in Tallinn.

References 

1970 births
Estonian female single skaters
Living people
Figure skaters from Tallinn
Estonian people of Russian descent